Laith Hussein Shihaib Al-Tawlid (born 13 October 1968) is an Iraqi former football player who was the captain of the Iraqi national team. He was vital to speaking out against Uday Hussein, the chairman of the Iraqi Olympic Committee, who was known for his brutality against the football team.

International career 
Hussein made his international debut at the age of 17 in 1986. He played in the 1988 Olympics in Seoul and helped Iraq win the Asian Youth Championship in Doha. In the World Youth Cup in Saudi Arabia a year later, Hussein was on the verge of joining Spanish giants Barcelona, after scoring one of the goals in a 2–0 win over Spain, helping Iraq to top their group, but was denied this move by then-president Saddam Hussein.

Managerial career 
Hussein was team manager of the Iraqi national team in 2013.

Career statistics

International
Scores and results list Iraq's goal tally first.

Honours
Individual
 Lebanese Premier League Best Player: 1997–98
 Lebanese Premier League Team of the Season: 1997–98, 1998–99

References

1968 births
Living people
Sportspeople from Baghdad
Iraqi footballers
Iraq international footballers
Olympic footballers of Iraq
Footballers at the 1988 Summer Olympics
1996 AFC Asian Cup players
Qatar Stars League players
Al-Rayyan SC players
Al-Zawraa SC players
Al-Rasheed players
Al-Wakrah SC players
Al Ansar FC players
Association football midfielders